The HB Flugtechnik HB-207 Alfa is an Austrian two-seat light training and touring monoplane designed and built by HB Flugtechnik and was made available as a kit for homebuilding.

Design and development
The Alfa is a low-wing monoplane made from aluminium, with some composite parts,  powered by a  VW-Porsche HB-2400 G/2 flat-four engine driving a five-bladed variable-pitch propeller. It was designed to take a number of different engines and to use two, three or five-bladed propellers. The five-bladed propeller turns at just 1500 rpm and is noted for its quietness in flight, producing only 57 dBA. The  Rotax 912ULS and the turbocharged  Rotax 914 powerplants can also be used. The Alfa has room for two in side-by-side seats in an enclosed cockpit with a sliding canopy for entry.

The first aircraft to fly was a retractable tricycle landing gear variant, the HB-207RG. on 14 March 1995. At least 70 had been built by 2005.

Variants
HB 207
Fixed landing gear variant
HB 207RG
Retractable landing gear variant

Specifications (Utility category)

References

Notes

Bibliography

 

Homebuilt aircraft
1990s Austrian civil utility aircraft
Alfa
Single-engined tractor aircraft
Low-wing aircraft
Aircraft first flown in 1995